Lueckingia is a genus in the family Ramalinaceae. It is a monotypic genus, containing the single corticolous lichen species Lueckingia polyspora. The genus and species were described as new to science in  2006. The species, known only from Costa Rica, was originally found growing on bark in the shaded understory of a lowland rainforest. The genus name honours German lichenologist Robert Lücking (b.1964), who organized the field trip that resulted in the discovery of the new species.

References

Ramalinaceae
Lichen genera
Monotypic Lecanorales genera
Taxa named by André Aptroot